The National Working Committee of the African National Congress, also known by its acronym the NWC, is a political body that comprises the top leaders of the African National Congress, South Africa's governing party. It is composed of 27 members, the "Top Seven" officials and 20 additional members who are elected by the party's National Executive Committee as soon as the National Conference concludes. 

The NWC is responsible for the day-to-day running of the party and makes recommendations to the NEC.

Composition
The NWC consists of the "Top Seven" (president, deputy president, national chairperson, secretary-general, two deputy secretaries-general, and treasurer-general) and 20 additional members who are elected from among the 80 members of the NEC. The African National Congress Veterans' League, African National Congress Women's League and the African National Congress Youth League each appoint one representative to serve on the NWC. The party requires at least 50% of the NWC members to be women. Some members are appointed full-time and have specific party responsibilities, while others hold other political offices. The NWC may invite any party member in good standing to attend its meetings and be given assignments, but the party member may not speak on behalf of the NWC and is not entitled to vote on resolutions.

Members
Following the conclusion of the party's 55th National Conference in December 2022, the NEC met over the weekend of 28–29 January 2023 to elect the new additional members of the NWC. The additional members are:

Previous composition
Following the NEC's first meeting after the 54th National Conference, the NWC for the 2017–2022 term was elected in January 2018. It was formally dissolved at the party's 55th National Conference. In addition to the Top Six, the members are:

 Barbara Creecy
 Thoko Didiza
 Bathabile Dlamini
 Nkosazana Dlamini-Zuma
 Derek Hanekom
 Tina Joemat-Pettersson
 Zizi Kodwa
 Ronald Lamola
 Dakota Legoete
 Pemmy Majodina (from 2018)
 Meokgo Matuba (Women's League)
 Senzo Mchunu
 Nomaindia Mfeketo (resigned 2021)
 Nonceba Mhlauli (Youth League)
 Thandi Modise
 Nomvula Mokonyane
 Edna Molewa (d. 2018)
 Angie Motshekga
 Nathi Mthethwa
 Naledi Pandor
 Jeff Radebe
 Gwen Ramkogopa (from 2021)
 Lindiwe Sisulu
 Tony Yengeni
 Snuki Zikalala (Veterans' League)

See also
National Executive Committee of the African National Congress

References

African National Congress